Cino (Scin in lombard) is a comune in the province of Sondrio in Italy, and it has a population of about 400 inhabitants, with an area of , the density is 67 inhabitants/km2 . Cino borders the following municipalities: Cercino, Mantello, Novate Mezzola, Dubino.

Cities and towns in Lombardy